Ryan Cusick (born November 12, 1999) is an American professional baseball pitcher in the Oakland Athletics organization. He played college baseball for the Wake Forest Demon Deacons.

Amateur career
Cusick began his high school career at Lincoln-Sudbury Regional High School in Sudbury, Massachusetts before transferring to Avon Old Farms School in Avon, Connecticut, for his senior year in 2018. He was selected by the Cincinnati Reds in the 40th round of the 2018 Major League Baseball draft, but did not sign and instead enrolled at Wake Forest University where he played college baseball.

In 2019, Cusick's freshman season, he led the Wake Forest pitching staff in wins, going 7-3 with a 6.44 ERA over  innings. That summer, he played in the Cape Cod Baseball League with the Bourne Braves. He pitched  innings in 2020 before the remainder of the season was cancelled due to the COVID-19 pandemic. As a junior in 2021, Cusick started 12 games and compiled a 3–5 record, a 4.24 ERA, and 108 strikeouts over seventy innings.

Professional career

Atlanta Braves
Cusick was selected by the Atlanta Braves in the first round with the 24th overall selection of the 2021 Major League Baseball draft. He signed with the Braves for a $2.7 million signing bonus. To begin his professional career, he was assigned to the Augusta GreenJackets of the Low-A East. During his first year in the minor leagues, Cusick pitched  innings, striking out 34 batters, walking four, and giving up five earned runs. Cusick joined the Braves' minor league camp before the 2022 season began.

Oakland Athletics
On March 14, 2022, the Braves traded Cusick, Cristian Pache, Shea Langeliers, and Joey Estes to the Oakland Athletics in exchange for Matt Olson. He was assigned to the Midland RockHounds of the Double-A Texas League for the 2022 season. Over 13 games (ten starts), he went 1-6 with a 7.12 ERA, 46 strikeouts, and thirty walks over 43 innings. He was selected to play in the Arizona Fall League for the Mesa Solar Sox after the season.

References

External links

Wake Forest Demon Deacons bio

1999 births
Living people
Baseball pitchers
Baseball players from Massachusetts
Bourne Braves players
Wake Forest Demon Deacons baseball players
Sportspeople from Middlesex County, Massachusetts
People from Sudbury, Massachusetts
Augusta GreenJackets players
Midland RockHounds players